Philip Martin Cunningham, MBE (born 27 January 1960 in Edinburgh, Scotland) is a Scottish folk musician and composer. He is best known for playing the accordion with Silly Wizard, as well as in other bands and in duets with his brother, Johnny. When they played together, they would egg each other on to play faster and faster, and try, light-heartedly, to trip each other up.

Phil has also collaborated with numerous other great Celtic musicians; one prominent example of this is his partnership with Aly Bain. The duo have (as of 2020) released nine albums, and between 1989 and 2019 they had a yearly spot at the New Year's Hogmanay Live broadcast on BBC Scotland.

Biography
Cunningham played accordion and violin from a young age. He attended school in Portobello, and was raised Mormon, attending church regularly and playing organ. However, by age fifteen due to issues with the Church of Jesus Christ of Latter-day Saints he left, and now describes himself as a spiritualist.

At the age of 16, he left school and joined his older brother Johnny in the group Silly Wizard, where he sang and played accordion, tin whistle, harmonium, guitar, and synthesizer. He also wrote many of the group's songs. After the breakup of Silly Wizard, Phil and Johnny recorded two albums and toured with Irish siblings Mícheál Ó Domhnaill and Triona Ni Domhnaill as the quartet Relativity. Phil has since had a successful solo career, releasing the solo albums Airs & Graces and The Palomino Waltz and producing albums with Aly Bain, Mark Knopfler, Dolores Keane, Altan, Connie Dover and Kris Drever.

In more recent years, Phil has also composed classical music and music for theatre and television, with 1997 seeing the premiere of his Highlands and Islands Suite at the Glasgow Royal Concert Hall.

In 2002, Phil was appointed MBE for services to Scottish music. He was awarded an honorary Doctor of Letters, at Glasgow Caledonian University's graduation ceremony on 27 November 2007.

Discography

Solo albums 
Airs & Graces (1983)
Palomino Waltz (1989)

Silly Wizard 
Caledonia's Hardy Sons (1978)
So Many Partings (1980)
Wild and Beautiful (1981)
Kiss the Tears Away (1983)
A Glint of Silver (1986)
Live Wizardry (1988)

Relativity 
Relativity (1986)
Gathering Pace (1987)

With Johnny Cunningham 
Against the Storm (1980)

With Aly Bain 
The Pearl (1995)
The Ruby (1997)
Another Gem (2000)
Spring The Summer Long (2003)
Best of Aly and Phil (2004)
Roads Not Travelled (2006)
Portrait (2010)
Five and Twenty (2012)
No Rush (2020)

With Connie Dover 
Somebody (1991)
The Wishing Well (1994)
If Ever I Return (1997)
The Border of Heaven (2000)

With Kris Drever 
Mark the Hard Earth (2010)

With Mark Knopfler 
Privateering (2012)

References

External links 
Official web site
BBC Scotland TV series website

1960 births
Living people
Members of the Order of the British Empire
Musicians from Edinburgh
Scottish folk musicians
Former Latter Day Saints
People educated at Portobello High School
Relativity (band) members
Silly Wizard members
21st-century accordionists
Tin whistle players
21st-century flautists